The Marstons Mills Community Church, formerly the Methodist Church, is a historic church building in the Marstons Mills village of Barnstable, Massachusetts.  The white clapboard church was built in the town of Yarmouth, and moved to Marstons Mills in 1830.  Its small belfry tower was added sometime between 1888 and 1908, around the same time it acquired some of its Queen Anne stylistic elements.  The church was listed on the National Register of Historic Places in 1987 for its architecture and for its role in community history.

Description and history
The Marstons Mills Community Church is set on the south side of Main Street, a short way northeast of its junction with Cotuit Road (Massachusetts Route 149).  It is a single-story wood-frame structure with a front-gable roof and clapboard siding.  A gable-roofed entry vestibule projects from the main facade, with a double-door frame by a simple surround and a fully pedimented gable.  The square church tower rises partly through the vestibule and partly through the main block, with a series of sections, some stepped in and others stepped out, and a belfry stage that has paired round-arch louvers on each side, and is topped by a flared pyramidal roof and weathervane.  The windows flanking the vestibule have decorative sashes, a Queen Anne embellishment also appearing on the door windows.

The Methodist congregation of Marstons Mills was organized in 1826, although there had been less formal meetings in private spaces at least as early as 1819.  This church building was hauled by oxen from Yarmouth in 1830 to serve as its sanctuary.  Over the 150 years it went through a number of alterations, the most visible being the addition of Queen Anne styling to the tower and of a surplus military barracks as a parish hall.  In 1968 the Marstons Mills congregation merged with that of Osterville, and this building was closed.  It was revived in 1981 as the nondenominational Marstons Mills Community Church.

See also
National Register of Historic Places listings in Barnstable County, Massachusetts

References

External links
Marstons Mills Community Church web site

1830 establishments in Massachusetts
Buildings and structures in Barnstable, Massachusetts
Churches completed in 1830
Churches in Barnstable County, Massachusetts
Churches on the National Register of Historic Places in Massachusetts
Methodist churches in Massachusetts
National Register of Historic Places in Barnstable, Massachusetts